In algebraic geometry, a morphism of schemes
f: X → Y
is called radicial or universally injective, if, for every field K the induced map X(K) → Y(K) is injective. (EGA I, (3.5.4)) This is a generalization of the notion of a purely inseparable extension of fields (sometimes called a radicial extension, which should not  be confused with a radical extension.)

It suffices to check this for K algebraically closed.

This is equivalent to the following condition: f is injective on the topological spaces and for every point x in X, the extension of the residue fields
k(f(x)) ⊂ k(x)
is radicial, i.e. purely inseparable.

It is also equivalent to every base change of f being injective on the underlying topological spaces. (Thus the term universally injective.)

Radicial morphisms are stable under composition, products and base change. If gf is radicial, so is f.

References
 , section I.3.5.
 , see section V.5.

Morphisms of schemes